Lonchoptera is a genus of spear-winged flies (Lonchopteridae). Their common name refers to their subacute (pointed) wings, which have a distinct and sexually dimorphic venation.

Description

The larvae are dorsally flattened, with two pairs of head bristles, and feed on rotting vegetable matter., including in one case brussels sprouts.

This genus can be distinguished from other spear-winged flies by several traits:
 foreleg tibiae have dorsal setae in the middle
 foreleg tarsi thinner than foreleg tibiae
 pointed wingtip without apical brown spot.

Species
Species include:

Lonchoptera africana Adams, 1905
Lonchoptera alfhildae Andersson, 1971
Lonchoptera anderssoni Joseph & Parui, 1976
Lonchoptera annikaae Andersson, 1971
Lonchoptera apicalis (Okada, 1935)
Lonchoptera barberi Klymko, 2008
Lonchoptera bifurcata (Fallén, 1810)
Lonchoptera birmanica Andersson, 1971
Lonchoptera birmensis Andersson, 1971
Lonchoptera casanova Andersson, 1971
Lonchoptera elinorae Andersson, 1971
Lonchoptera excavata Yang & Chen, 1995
Lonchoptera fallax de Meijere, 1906
Lonchoptera hakonensis Matsumura, 1916
Lonchoptera impicta Zetterstedt, 1848
Lonchoptera japonica Matsumura, 1915
Lonchoptera kamtschatkana (Czerny, 1934)
Lonchoptera longiphallus Klymko, 2008
Lonchoptera lutea Panzer, 1809
Lonchoptera maculata Smith, 1974
Lonchoptera malaisei Andersson, 1971
Lonchoptera megaloba Klymko, 2008
Lonchoptera meijerei Collin, 1938
Lonchoptera nerana Vaillant, 1989
Lonchoptera nevadica Vaillant, 1989
Lonchoptera nigrociliata Duda, 1927
Lonchoptera nitidifrons Strobl, 1898
Lonchoptera occidentalis Curran, 1934
Lonchoptera orientalis (Kertész, 1914)
Lonchoptera pictipennis Bezzi, 1899
Lonchoptera pinglongshanensis Dong, Pang & Yang, 2008
Lonchoptera pipi Andersson, 1971
Lonchoptera platytarsis (Okada, 1935)
Lonchoptera rava Whittington, 1991
Lonchoptera sapporensis Matsumura, 1915
Lonchoptera scutellata Stein, 1890
Lonchoptera stackelbergi (Czerny, 1934)
Lonchoptera strobli de Meijere, 1906
Lonchoptera transvaalensis Stuckenberg, 1963
Lonchoptera tristis Meigen, 1824
Lonchoptera ugandensis Whittington, 1991
Lonchoptera unicolor Dong, Pang & Yang, 2008
Lonchoptera uniseta Curran, 1934
Lonchoptera vaillanti Zwick, 2004
Lonchoptera vesperis Stuckenberg, 1963

References

Platypezoidea genera
Lonchopteridae
Taxa named by Johann Wilhelm Meigen